Morteza Sharifi (born May 27, 1999 in Urmia) is an Iranian volleyball player who plays as an outside spiker for the Iranian national team and Turkish club Galatasaray.

Club career
On 15 August 2022, he signed a one-year contract with Galatasaray, one of the Turkish Men's Volleyball League teams.

National team career
Sharifi in 2018 year invited to Iran senior national team by Igor Kolaković and made his debut match against France in the 2018 Nations League.

Honours

National team
Asian Games
Gold medal (1): 2018
U21 World Championship
Gold medal (1): 2019
Asian U20 Championship
Gold medal (1): 2018
U19 World Championship
Gold medal (1): 2017

Individual
Best Outside Spiker: 2017 Asian U19 Championship
Best Outside Spiker: 2018 Asian U20 Championship
Best Outside Spiker: 2019 U21 World Championship

References

External links

 

1999 births
Living people
People from Urmia
Iranian men's volleyball players
Iranian expatriate sportspeople in Turkey
Asian Games medalists in volleyball
Volleyball players at the 2018 Asian Games
Medalists at the 2018 Asian Games
Asian Games gold medalists for Iran
Iranian expatriate sportspeople in Italy
Olympic volleyball players of Iran
Volleyball players at the 2020 Summer Olympics
Outside hitters
Galatasaray S.K. (men's volleyball) players
21st-century Iranian people